"Stand by Love" is a 1991 song by the Scottish rock band Simple Minds. It was the third single to be taken from their ninth studio album Real Life. The song was written by bandmembers Charlie Burchill and Jim Kerr and was produced by Stephen Lipson.

The single peaked at number 13 in the UK.

Track listings
7" single
 "Stand by Love" - 4:09
 "King Is White & in the Crowd" (live, Los Angeles, 19.06.91) – 4:21

12" and CD single
 "Stand by Love" – 4:09
 "King Is White & in the Crowd" (live, Los Angeles, 19.06.91) – 4:21
 "Let There Be Love" (live, Los Angeles, 19.06.91) – 5:22

Cassette single
 "Stand by Love" (live, Glasgow, 13.08.91) – 4:26
 "Someone Somewhere in Summertime" (live, Glasgow, 13.08.91) – 5:34
 "Banging on the Door" (live, Glasgow, 13.08.91) – 5:45

Charts

References

External links
 Discogs

1991 singles
Song recordings produced by Stephen Lipson
Songs written by Jim Kerr
Virgin Records singles
1991 songs
Songs written by Charlie Burchill